Muhammad Anwar is a Pakistani politician who is member-elect of the Gilgit Baltistan Assembly.

Political career
Anwar contested 2020 Gilgit-Baltistan Assembly election on 15 November 2020 from constituency GBA-16 (Diamer-II) on the ticket from Pakistan Muslim League (N). He won the election by the margin of 499 votes over the Independent runner up Attaullah. He garnered 4,813 votes while Attaullah received 4,314 votes.

References

Living people
Gilgit-Baltistan MLAs 2020–2025
Politicians from Gilgit-Baltistan
Year of birth missing (living people)